Shugozero is a rural locality (a posyolok) in Shugozyorskoye Rural Settlement of Tikhvinsky District, in Leningrad Oblast, Russia. Population:

References 

Rural localities in Leningrad Oblast